Pisgah United Methodist Church and Cemetery is a historic church in Pisgah, Tennessee. It was built in 1867 and added to the National Register in 1984.

References

United Methodist churches in Tennessee
Churches on the National Register of Historic Places in Tennessee
Churches completed in 1867
19th-century Methodist church buildings in the United States
Churches in Giles County, Tennessee
Methodist cemeteries
National Register of Historic Places in Giles County, Tennessee